Albert C. Mays (May 17, 1865 – May 7, 1905) was an American baseball pitcher. He played five seasons in Major League Baseball for the Louisville Colonels (1885), New York Metropolitans (1886–1887), Brooklyn Bridegrooms (1888), Columbus Solons (1889–1890), all in the American Association. In 1887, he appeared in a career-high 52 games, threw 50 complete games, and led the American Association that year with 34 losses and 232 earned runs allowed. Mays concluded his pitching career in the minor leagues, including stints with Erie (1891, 1893, 1894), Wilkes-Barre (1892), and Peoria (1892).

Mays was  born in 1865 in Canal Dover, Ohio. He died at age 39 in an accidental drowning in 1905 near Blennerhasset Island in the Ohio River.

References

1865 births
1905 deaths
19th-century baseball players
Major League Baseball pitchers
Brooklyn Bridegrooms players
Columbus Solons players
Louisville Colonels players
New York Metropolitans players
Allentown Kelly's Killers players
Aurora Indians players
Erie Blackbirds players
Johnstown Pirates players
Oil City players
Peoria Distillers players
Wilkes-Barre Coal Barons players
Baseball players from Ohio
People from Dover, Ohio
Accidental deaths in West Virginia
Deaths by drowning in the United States